Wayne L. Gardner (born May 19, 1947) is a former member of the Arizona House of Representatives. He served in the House from January 1999 through January 2001, representing district 29. He did not run for re-election in 2000.

References

Republican Party members of the Arizona House of Representatives
1947 births
Living people